Altap Salamander (formerly known as Servant Salamander) is a freeware orthodox file manager for Microsoft Windows, originally inspired by Norton Commander. In contrast to several other file managers, it has a context aware user interface hiding complexity – for instance, the bottom function list changes on press of modifier keys, just showing the currently available hotkey function set.

Its development was started in 1996 as a hobby project by Petr Šolín (from Czech Republic) during his studies at university and released as freeware in 1997. It was originally written in Watcom C++, later in Microsoft Visual C++ 6.0.

The first shareware version 2.0 was released in 2001 by a newly established company Altap. Salamander 2.0 included support for viewer and archiver plugins. During the development of 2.5 version the plugin architecture was expanded to support file system plugins to support FTP and other protocols.

The plugin SDK for 2.5 version allows plugin developers to create new viewer plugins (for file previews), archiver plugins (for browsing/unpacking/packing archives), file system plugins (for custom directory listing) and tools (like multi-rename or file compare). Custom column plugins known from Total Commander are not supported, neither yet non-latin alphabets of the Unicode.

The version 3 series newly supports the MS Windows 7 and higher, two binaries are available, for users' choice: 32-bit and 64-bit.

Starting with version 4.0, Salamander has become freeware again, however active development has been indefinitely suspended as of July 2019.

See also 
 comparison of file managers

References

External links 
 
 Altap Salamander Release Notes

C++ software
FTP clients
Orthodox file managers
Windows-only shareware